C. ursinus may refer to:
 Callorhinus ursinus, a seal species
 Canis ursinus, a prehistoric canine species in the genus Canis
 Centropogon ursinus, a plant species

See also
 Ursinus (disambiguation)